Under the Radar is the third full-length studio album by the hardcore band Grade. It was released by Victory Records on October 12, 1999.

Track listing
 "The Inefficiency of Emotion"
 "For The Memory of Love"
 "Seamless"
 "The Tension Between Stillness and Motion"
 "Victims of Mathematics"
 "A Year in the Past, Forever in the Future"
 "The Worst Lies Are Told in Silence"
 "Second Chance at First Place"
 "Stolen Bikes Ride Faster" 
 "When Something Goes to Your Head"
 "Triumph and Tragedy"

Reception and legacy

References

1999 albums
Victory Records albums
Grade (band) albums